Laura Misciagna (born 29 February 1960 in Toronto, Ontario) is a paralympic athlete from Canada competing mainly in category C2 events.

Misciagna competed in the 1984 Summer Paralympics in athletics and boccia, winning gold medals in the athletics in Women's 200 metres, 60 metres and Slalom. In the 1988 Summer Paralympics, she won bronze in the mixed 4x100 metres.

References

1960 births
Living people
Athletes (track and field) at the 1984 Summer Paralympics
Boccia players at the 1984 Summer Paralympics
Athletes (track and field) at the 1988 Summer Paralympics
Paralympic gold medalists for Canada
Paralympic bronze medalists for Canada
Athletes from Toronto
Medalists at the 1984 Summer Paralympics
Medalists at the 1988 Summer Paralympics
Paralympic medalists in athletics (track and field)
Paralympic track and field athletes of Canada